Louisbourg Expedition may refer to:

 Duc d'Anville Expedition or Louisbourg Expedition (1746), a French attempt to capture Louisbourg during the War of the Austrian Succession
 Louisbourg Expedition (1757), a British attempt to capture Louisbourg during the Seven Years' War

See also
 Siege of Louisbourg (disambiguation)